Hubli-Dharwad Municipal Corporation (abbreviated as HDMC) is the Municipal Corporation responsible for the civic infrastructure and administration of the twin cities of Hubli and Dharwad, located in North Western part of Karnataka state in India. The organization is known, in short, as HDMC. This civic administrative body administers an area of 213 km2. HDMC consists of 82 elected members from four Vidhan Sabha constituencies of Hubali-Dharwad. Presently the Council is under suspended animation pending election of new members. There has been a huge demand by people of Dharwad to create a separate civic body and get itself detached by HDMC. Claims are that most of the funds are allocated to Hubli solely.

Overview

The total area under HDMC is 213 km2. The twin cities are currently divided into 82 wards. Each ward elects a corporator. The winning party elects a council of members, who are responsible for various departments. The council members chose the Mayor among themselves. At present, there are sixty seven members in the council. The Commissioner is the highest officer of Municipal Corporate Office, who is responsible for the departments of public works, revenue and tax, water supply, planning and development, fire brigade, health and sanitation, finance and accounts etc. The current Municipal Commissioner is Shri Suresh Itnal (KAS) while presently the municipal council is under animated suspension pending election of new members.

History
Prior to incorporation of HDMC, both Hubli and Dharwad had their own municipal bodies, namely Hubli Municipal Council which was established on 15 August 1855 under the Government of India Act of 1850. Its membership was fixed at 18, including the President. The Collector of the district functioned as the President, and the members were called commissioners. The government nominated all the members. On the other hand, Dharwad Municipal Council first came into existence on 1 January 1856. The first non-official President of the Council was Shri. S.K. Rodda in 1907, and Shri. S.V. Mensinkai was nominated in the following year. But the credit of being the first elected President goes to Shri. N.G. Karigudari, who took office in 1920.

In the year 1962, a unique experiment in urban development was conducted by The Directorate of Municipal Administration, Karnataka by combining two cities separated by a distance of 20 kilometers. Thus Hubli-Dharwad Municipal Corporation was constituted.

Demographics
The population of the twin cities as per provisional figures of Census 2011 is 943,857 and is urban. Hubli-Dharwad's population increased by 22.99% between 1981 and 1991, from 527,108 to 648,298, and by 21.2% between 1991 and 2001. The municipality covers 213 km².

Departments

ADM
Election and Census
PWD
DoTP 
Revenue
Council 
Accounts
Audit
IT
Electricity
Control Room
Hospital and Dispensaries
Health and Sanitation
Spl. Office
Law
Water Supply
HRD
Education
Horticulture
Swimming Pool

Wards
HDMC had 67 wards from 2008 to 2018

Number of wards was increased to 82 in 2018 and  first election post delimitation was held on 3 September 2021 Ward Maps were published in Dharwad district website.

Of 82 Wards, 28 belong to Dharwad and 54 are in Hubli region.

BJP emerged as single largest party in 2021 HDMC elections by winning 39 of 82 seats. INC accused AIMIM for splitting Minority votes and making way for BJP's victory. Mayor's post is reserved for Backward class A category and Deputy Mayor's Post was limited to Scheduled Castes Woman.

Demand for separate municipal corporation for Dharwad 
The citizens of Dharwad city accuses HDMC for biased decisions towards their area and demand for a separate municipal corporation in Dharwad by splitting from HDMC. The demand was acknowledged by Chief minister Basavaraj Bommai on 25 August 2021 who opined that Dharwad deserved a separate municipal corporation.

Functions 
Hubli-Dharwad Municipal Corporation is created for the following functions:

 Planning for the town including its surroundings which are covered under its Department's Urban Planning Authority .
 Approving construction of new buildings and authorising use of land for various purposes.
 Improvement of the town's economic and Social status.
 Arrangements of water supply towards commercial,residential and industrial purposes.
 Planning for fire contingencies through Fire Service Departments.
 Creation of solid waste management,public health system and sanitary services.
 Working for the development of ecological aspect like development of Urban Forestry and making guidelines for environmental protection.
 Working for the development of weaker sections of the society like mentally and physically handicapped,old age and gender biased people.
 Making efforts for improvement of slums and poverty removal in the town.

Revenue sources 

The following are the Income sources for the Corporation from the Central and State Government.

Revenue from taxes 
Following is the Tax related revenue for the corporation.

 Property tax.
 Profession tax.
 Entertainment tax.
 Grants from Central and State Government like Goods and Services Tax.
 Advertisement tax.

Revenue from non-tax sources 

Following is the Non Tax related revenue for the corporation.

 Water usage charges.
 Fees from Documentation services.
 Rent received from municipal property.
 Funds from municipal bonds.

Revenue from taxes 
Following is the Tax related revenue for the corporation.

 Property tax.
 Profession tax.
 Entertainment tax.
 Grants from Central and State Government like Goods and Services Tax.
 Advertisement tax.

Revenue from non-tax sources 

Following is the Non Tax related revenue for the corporation.

 Water usage charges.
 Fees from Documentation services.
 Rent received from municipal property.
 Funds from municipal bonds.

See also
List of municipal corporations in India

References

External links
HDMC official website
Directorate of Municipal Administration, Karnataka

Municipal corporations in Karnataka
Government of Dharwad
Hubli–Dharwad
1962 establishments in Mysore State
Dharwad district